St. Gummarus could be
Gummarus, the patron saint of lumberjacks, forest workers, foresters, woodcutters and Lier, Belgium
St. Gummarus (beer) - the Belgian beer also called Sint-Gummarus brewed by the microbrewery "Sint Jozef" 
St. Gummarus Church, the gothic architecture structure in Lier